Darius Days (born October 20, 1999) is an American professional basketball player for the Houston Rockets of the National Basketball Association (NBA), on a two-way contract with the Rio Grande Valley Vipers of the NBA G League. He played college basketball for the LSU Tigers of the Southeastern Conference (SEC).

High school career
Days attended Williston High School in Williston, Florida as a freshman, playing junior varsity football. For his sophomore season, he transferred to The Rock School in Gainesville, Florida and focused on basketball. As a junior, Days averaged 21 points and 10 rebounds per game, earning Gainesville Sun Small Schools Co-Player of the Year honors. He moved to IMG Academy in Bradenton, Florida for his senior season. Days committed to playing college basketball for LSU over offers from North Carolina, Louisville, Ohio State and Xavier.

College career
As a freshman at LSU, Days averaged 5.3 points and four rebounds in 14.6 minutes per game. In his next year, he moved into the starting lineup. On January 8, 2020, Days recorded 16 points and 16 rebounds in a 79–77 win over Arkansas. As a sophomore, he averaged 11.1 points and 6.8 rebounds per game. Days declared for the 2020 NBA draft before withdrawing his name and returning to college. On November 26, 2020, he made his junior season debut, scoring 24 points in a 94–81 victory over SIU Edwardsville. Days missed one game with a sprained ankle. As a junior, he averaged 11.6 points and a team-leading 7.8 rebounds per game. Following the season, Days declared for the 2021 NBA draft. However, he opted to withdraw from the draft and return to LSU. Days was named to the Second Team All-SEC as a senior. He averaged 13.7 points and 7.8 rebounds per game.

Professional career

Houston Rockets (2022–present) 
After it was initially reported that Days would sign with the San Antonio Spurs after going undrafted in the 2022 NBA draft, he instead signed a two-way contract with the Miami Heat on July 16, 2022. On October 9, his two-way contract was converted to an exhibit 10 contract, and he was subsequently waived. On October 11, he was claimed off waivers by the Houston Rockets.

Career statistics

College

|-
| style="text-align:left;"| 2018–19
| style="text-align:left;"| LSU
| 35 || 3 || 14.6 || .485 || .382 || .743 || 4.0 || .4 || .7 || .3 || 5.3
|-
| style="text-align:left;"| 2019–20
| style="text-align:left;"| LSU
| 31 || 30 || 23.5 || .486 || .295 || .786 || 6.8 || .8 || .6 || .3 || 11.1
|-
| style="text-align:left;"| 2020–21
| style="text-align:left;"| LSU
| 28 || 28 || 27.0 || .519 || .400 || .703 || 7.8 || .6 || 1.1 || .3 || 11.6
|-
| style="text-align:left;"| 2021–22
| style="text-align:left;"| LSU
| 33 || 33 || 29.8 || .434 || .350 || .700 || 7.8 || .9 || 1.5 || .3 || 13.7
|- class="sortbottom"
| style="text-align:center;" colspan="2"| Career
| 127 || 94 || 23.4 || .474 || .353 || .734 || 6.5 || .7 || 1.0 || .3 || 10.3

Personal life
Days is the son of Tracy and Greg Days. His favorite NBA players are Draymond Green, who he has compared himself to, and Carmelo Anthony.

References

External links
LSU Tigers bio

1999 births
Living people
American men's basketball players
Basketball players from Gainesville, Florida
Houston Rockets players
IMG Academy alumni
LSU Tigers basketball players
Power forwards (basketball)
Rio Grande Valley Vipers players
Undrafted National Basketball Association players